The  is a railway line in south-eastern Kyushu, Japan, operated by Kyushu Railway Company (JR Kyushu). It connects Minami-Miyazaki Station in Miyazaki, Miyazaki to Shibushi Station in Shibushi, Kagoshima.

History
The Miyazaki Prefectural Government opened the first section of the line from Obi - Aburatsu in 1913, the same year that the Miyazaki Light Railway was opened from the port of Miyazaki to Uchiumi. The lines were linked in 1932, and nationalised in 1935. The extension to Kitago opened in 1941, and to Shibushi (as a passenger only section) in 1963.

Steam locomotives were withdrawn from the line in 1973. Freight services to Kitago ceased in 1982, and in 1990 the Shibushi station was relocated 100m closer to Miyazaki. The Minami Miyazaki - Tayoshi section was electrified in 1996 in conjunction with the opening of the Miyazaki Airport line. Subsequently, the line has been electrified as far as Kodomonokuni.

Former connecting lines
Shibushi station - 
 The 39 km line to Nishi Miyakonojo (known as the Shibushi Line) opened between 1923 and 1925, connecting to the Nippo Main Line. Freight service ended in 1983 and the line closed in 1987.
 The 98 km line to Kokubo (known as the Osumi Line), also connecting to the Nippo Main Line, was not completed until 1972. The first section was opened by the Osumi Light Railway Co. as a 762mm gauge line from Funama to Kushira, via a reversing station at Kanoya, between 1915 and 1923. The line was nationalised in 1935, the same year the Shibushi - Higashikushira section was opened by JR. The 1 km connection to Kushira opened the following year, and in 1938 the Kushira - Funama section was regauged, with a new station at Kanoya removing the need to reverse direction there. The Funama - Kaigata section opened in 1961 as a passenger only line, and the Kaigata - Kokubu section also opened without freight service. The rest of the line lost freight service in 1982, and the entire line closed in 1987.

Stations
•: Stops
|: Non-stop

References
This article incorporates material from the corresponding article in the Japanese Wikipedia

Lines of Kyushu Railway Company
Rail transport in Miyazaki Prefecture
Rail transport in Kagoshima Prefecture
1067 mm gauge railways in Japan
Railway lines opened in 1913
1913 establishments in Japan